Ronald "Ronnie" Magsanoc (born April 11, 1966) is a Filipino coach, basketball analyst, and retired professional basketball player in the Philippine Basketball Association (PBA). He was known for his moniker "The Point Laureate".

Collegiate career
Magsanoc played collegiate ball with Benjie Paras, Eric Altamirano, future UP head coach Goldwin Monteverde and Joey Guanio for the University of the Philippines basketball squad, then coached by Joe Lipa, where he helped the Fighting Maroons win the UAAP championship in 1986, their first basketball championship in 48 years.

Amateur career
Aside from national team stints in the 1986 Asian Games, 1987 Jones Cup, ABC championships and SEA Games under coach Joe Lipa, Magsanoc saw action for YCO Shine Masters and Philips Sardines in the PABL.

Professional career
Magsanoc joined the Philippine Basketball Association in 1988 and was picked by Shell while his former national teammates Jojo Lastimosa, Glenn Capacio, Jerry Codiñera and Alvin Patrimonio were absorbed by newcomer Purefoods Hotdogs in one of the best entries of freshman cagers to the pro ranks.

The following season in his sophomore year, Magsanoc was reunited with former UP teammate Benjie Paras, who was the number 1 overall draft pick that year. The triumvirate of Magsanoc, Paras and seven-time best import Bobby Parks led Shell to the finals in the first conference each year from 1989 to 1992, winning two championships and placing runner-up twice. Magsanoc was considered by fans and experts alike as one of the best point guard in the league at the turn of the decade.

From 1993 to 1995, he remains one of the top point guards despite Shell missing the finals trip for three seasons and with the emergence of Alaska's Johnny Abarrientos. In 1996, Shell return to the finals but Magsanoc missed out playing in the championship because of an injury. Finally, after 10 seasons with Shell, Magsanoc was surprisingly traded to Sta. Lucia Realtors for Gerry Esplana beginning the 1998 PBA season, the "Point Laureate" was lost in the limelight as a Realtor. In 2001, he joined Purefoods Tender Juicy Hotdogs and was reunited with former YCO teammate in the PABL and national teammate Alvin Patrimonio, together they won their final championship in the PBA in the 2002 Governors Cup.

He was also a member of the all-professional Philippine National Team that took home the silver medal in the 1990 Asian Games.

In 2000, he was named a member of the PBA's 25 Greatest Players.

In 2013, he was enshrined into the PBA Hall of Fame, along with Paras, Lim Eng Beng, and the late Ed Ocampo.

Post-retirement and coaching career
 On retirement from playing basketball, Magsanoc went into coaching basketball teams. He was the former assistant coach of the Purefoods Tender Juicy Giants and currently serving under Norman Black as assistant for Meralco Bolts.
 He is a color commentator for the television coverage of the PBA from mid-2000s, until now when his team were not playing.
 He also served as a pre-game reporter for the Game 7 of 1998 PBA All-Filipino Cup.
 He was the head coach of the San Beda Red Lions for the 88th season of NCAA (2012–13). He resigned his coaching job in San Beda after winning a championship in his rookie year.
 He also served as an assistant coach for the Ateneo Blue Eagles, a collegiate varsity team in the Philippines. He is the lead assistant and leads the huddle when timeouts occurred.
 He formerly served as the former head coach of the Lamoiyan Corp. PBA D-League team, Hapee Fresh Fighters.
 He formerly served as a play-by-play commentator in the Shakey's V-League 12th Season Collegiate Conference and in the Solar Sports coverage of the 2015 PSL Grand Prix Conference. He served as a color commentator when the league was changed as the Premier Volleyball League and being broadcast on S+A.
 Magsanoc is a regular color commentator for the UNTV Cup since its inaugural season in 2013 up to present.

Coaching record

Collegiate career

References

1966 births
Living people
Asian Games bronze medalists for the Philippines
Asian Games medalists in basketball
Asian Games silver medalists for the Philippines
Basketball players at the 1986 Asian Games
Basketball players at the 1990 Asian Games
Filipino men's basketball coaches
Filipino television sportscasters
Magnolia Hotshots players
Medalists at the 1986 Asian Games
Medalists at the 1990 Asian Games
Philippine Basketball Association All-Stars
Magnolia Hotshots coaches
Philippines men's national basketball team players
Filipino men's basketball players
Point guards
Shell Turbo Chargers players
Sta. Lucia Realtors players
UP Fighting Maroons basketball players
Shell Turbo Chargers draft picks
Meralco Bolts coaches
San Beda Red Lions basketball coaches
Ateneo Blue Eagles men's basketball coaches
UP Fighting Maroons basketball coaches